West African Airlines  was a scheduled passenger and cargo airline based in Cotonou, Benin. It operated regional flights, with an extension to Europe, using wet-leased aircraft. The airline was established in 2003 and started operations on 29 June 2003. However, it went bankrupt the following year.

Destinations

International scheduled destinations included: Abidjan, Accra, Bamako, Bangui, Banjul, Brazzaville, Conakry, Dakar, Douala, Kinshasa, Lagos, Libreville, Lomé, Paris and Pointe-Noire and to Delhi and Bombay.

See also		
 List of defunct airlines of Benin

References

			 

Airlines established in 2003
Airlines disestablished in 2004
Companies based in Cotonou